The 1947 Kentucky Wildcats football team was an American footballteam that represented the University of Kentucky as a member of the Southeastern Conference during the 1947 college football season. In its second season under head coach Bear Bryant, the team compiled an 8–3 record (2–3 against SEC opponents), defeated Villanova in the Great Lakes Bowl, and outscored all opponents by a total of 175 to 73. The team played its home games at McLean Stadium in Lexington, Kentucky.

The 1947 Kentucky team was ranked in the AP Poll during three weeks of the season: No. 20 on October 13; No. 14 on October 20; and No. 13 on October 27. Kentucky dropped out of the poll after losing its second game to Alabama.

Three Kentucky players were honored on the 1947 All-SEC football teams selected by both the Associated Press (AP) and United Press (UP): center Jay Rhodemyre (AP-1; UP-1); tackle Wash Serini (AP-2); and guard Lee Yarutis (AP-3).

Junior George Blanda was Kentucky's starting quarterback in 1947 and 1948. Blanda later played 26 years in the National Football League and set the league's all-time scoring record.

Schedule

References

Kentucky
Kentucky Wildcats football seasons
Kentucky Wildcats football